

Events

Pre-1600
 217 – Roman emperor Caracalla is assassinated and is succeeded by his Praetorian Guard prefect, Marcus Opellius Macrinus.
 876 – The Battle of Dayr al-'Aqul saves Baghdad from the Saffarids.
1139 – Roger II of Sicily is excommunicated by Innocent II for supporting Anacletus II as pope for seven years, even though Roger had already publicly recognized Innocent's claim to the papacy.
1232 – Mongol–Jin War: The Mongols begin their siege on Kaifeng, the capital of the Jin dynasty.
1250 – Seventh Crusade: Ayyubids of Egypt capture King Louis IX of France in the Battle of Fariskur.
1271 – In Syria, sultan Baibars conquers the Krak des Chevaliers.

1601–1900
1605 – The city of Oulu, Finland, is founded by Charles IX of Sweden.
1730 – Shearith Israel, the first synagogue in continental North America, is dedicated.
1812 – Czar Alexander I, the Russian Emperor and the Grand Duke of Finland, officially announces the transfer of the status of the Finnish capital from Turku to Helsinki.
1820 – The Venus de Milo is discovered on the Aegean island of Milos.
1832 – Black Hawk War: Around 300 United States 6th Infantry troops leave St. Louis, Missouri to fight the Sauk Native Americans.
1866 – Austro-Prussian War: Italy and Prussia sign a secret alliance against the Austrian Empire.
1886 – William Ewart Gladstone introduces the first Irish Home Rule Bill into the British House of Commons.
1895 – In Pollock v. Farmers' Loan & Trust Co. the Supreme Court of the United States declares unapportioned income tax to be unconstitutional.

1901–present
1904 – The French Third Republic and the United Kingdom of Great Britain and Ireland sign the Entente cordiale.
1906 – Auguste Deter, the first person to be diagnosed with Alzheimer's disease, dies.
1908 – Harvard University votes to establish the Harvard Business School.
1911 – Dutch physicist Heike Kamerlingh Onnes discovers superconductivity.
1913 – The 17th Amendment to the United States Constitution, requiring direct election of Senators, becomes law.
1918 – World War I: Actors Douglas Fairbanks and Charlie Chaplin sell war bonds on the streets of New York City's financial district.
1924 – Sharia courts are abolished in Turkey, as part of Atatürk's Reforms.
1929 – Indian independence movement: At the Delhi Central Assembly, Bhagat Singh and Batukeshwar Dutt throw handouts and bombs to court arrest.
1935 – The Works Progress Administration is formed when the Emergency Relief Appropriation Act of 1935 becomes law.
1940 – The Central Committee of the Mongolian People's Revolutionary Party elects Yumjaagiin Tsedenbal as General Secretary, marking the beginning of his 44-year-long tenure as de facto leader of Mongolia.
1942 – World War II: The Japanese take Bataan in the Philippines.
1943 – U.S. President Franklin D. Roosevelt, in an attempt to check inflation, freezes wages and prices, prohibits workers from changing jobs unless the war effort would be aided thereby, and bars rate increases by common carriers and public utilities.
1943 – Otto and Elise Hampel are executed in Berlin for their anti-Nazi activities.
1945 – World War II: After an air raid accidentally destroys a train carrying about 4,000 Nazi concentration camp internees in Prussian Hanover, the survivors are massacred by Nazis.
1946 – Électricité de France, the world's largest utility company, is formed as a result of the nationalisation of a number of electricity producers, transporters and distributors.
1950 – India and Pakistan sign the Liaquat–Nehru Pact.
1952 – U.S. President Harry Truman calls for the seizure of all domestic steel mills in an attempt to prevent the 1952 steel strike.
1953 – Mau Mau leader Jomo Kenyatta is convicted by British Kenya's rulers.
1954 – A Royal Canadian Air Force Canadair Harvard collides with a Trans-Canada Airlines Canadair North Star over Moose Jaw, Saskatchewan, killing 37 people.
  1954   – South African Airways Flight 201 A de Havilland DH.106 Comet 1 crashes into the sea during night killing 21 people.
1959 – A team of computer manufacturers, users, and university people led by Grace Hopper meets to discuss the creation of a new programming language that would be called COBOL.
  1959   – The Organization of American States drafts an agreement to create the Inter-American Development Bank.
1960 – The Netherlands and West Germany sign an agreement to negotiate the return of German land annexed by the Dutch in return for 280 million German marks as Wiedergutmachung.
1968 – BOAC Flight 712 catches fire shortly after takeoff. As a result of her actions in the accident, Barbara Jane Harrison is awarded a posthumous George Cross, the only GC awarded to a woman in peacetime.
1970 – Bahr El-Baqar primary school bombing: Israeli bombers accidentally strike an Egyptian school. Forty-six children are killed.
1975 – Frank Robinson manages the Cleveland Indians in his first game as major league baseball's first African American manager.
1987 – Los Angeles Dodgers executive Al Campanis resigns amid controversy over racist remarks he had made while on Nightline.
1992 – Retired tennis great Arthur Ashe announces that he has AIDS, acquired from blood transfusions during one of his two heart surgeries.

1993 – The Republic of North Macedonia joins the United Nations.
  1993   – The Space Shuttle Discovery is launched on mission STS-56.
2004 – War in Darfur: The Humanitarian Ceasefire Agreement is signed by the Sudanese government, the Justice and Equality Movement, and the Sudan Liberation Movement/Army. 
2005 – A solar eclipse occurs, visible over areas of the Pacific Ocean and Latin American countries such as Costa Rica, Panama, Colombia and Venezuela. 
2006 – Shedden massacre: The bodies of eight men, all shot to death, are found in a field in Shedden, Elgin County, Ontario. The murders are soon linked to the Bandidos Motorcycle Club.
2008 – The construction of the world's first skyscraper to integrate wind turbines is completed in Bahrain.
2010 – U.S. President Barack Obama and Russian President Dmitry Medvedev sign the New START Treaty. 
2013 – The Islamic State of Iraq enters the Syrian Civil War and begins by declaring a merger with the Al-Nusra Front under the name Islamic State of Iraq and ash-Sham.
2014 – Windows XP reaches it's standard End Of Life and is no longer supported
2020 – Bernie Sanders ends his presidential campaign, leaving Joe Biden as the Democratic Party's nominee.

Births

Pre-1600
1320 – Peter I of Portugal (d. 1367)
1408 – Jadwiga of Lithuania, Polish princess (d. 1431)
1435 – John Clifford, 9th Baron de Clifford, English noble (d. 1461)
1533 – Claudio Merulo, Italian organist and composer (d. 1604)
1536 – Barbara of Hesse (d. 1597)
1541 – Michele Mercati, Italian physician and archaeologist (d. 1593)
1580 – William Herbert, 3rd Earl of Pembroke, English noble, courtier and patron of the arts (d. 1630)
1596 – Juan van der Hamen, Spanish artist (d. 1631)

1601–1900
1605 – Philip IV of Spain (d. 1665)
  1605   – Mary Stuart, English-Scottish princess (d. 1607)
1641 – Henry Sydney, 1st Earl of Romney, English general and politician, Secretary of State for the Northern Department (d. 1704)
1692 – Giuseppe Tartini, Italian violinist and composer (d. 1770)
1726 – Lewis Morris, American judge and politician (d. 1798)
1732 – David Rittenhouse, American astronomer and mathematician (d. 1796)
1761 – William Joseph Chaminade, French priest, founded the Society of Mary (d. 1850)
1770 – John Thomas Campbell, Irish-Australian banker and politician (d. 1830)
1798 – Dionysios Solomos, Greek poet and author (d. 1857)
1818 – Christian IX of Denmark (d. 1906)
  1818   – August Wilhelm von Hofmann, German chemist and academic (d. 1892)
1826 – Pancha Carrasco, Costa Rican soldier (d. 1890)
1827 – Ramón Emeterio Betances, Puerto Rican ophthalmologist, journalist, and politician (d. 1898)
1842 – Elizabeth Bacon Custer, American author and educator (d. 1933)
1859 – Edmund Husserl, German Jewish-Austrian mathematician and philosopher (d. 1938)
1864 – Carlos Deltour, French rower and rugby player (d. 1920)
1867 – Allen Butler Talcott, American painter and educator (d. 1908) 
1869 – Harvey Cushing, American surgeon and academic (d. 1939)
1871 – Clarence Hudson White, American photographer and educator (d. 1925)
1874 – Manuel Díaz, Cuban fencer (d. 1929)
  1874   – Stanisław Taczak, Polish general (d. 1960)
1875 – Albert I of Belgium (d. 1934)
1882 (O.S. 27 March) – Dmytro Doroshenko, Lithuanian-Ukrainian historian and politician, Minister of Foreign Affairs of Ukraine and Prime Minister of Ukraine (d. 1951)
1883 – R. P. Keigwin, English cricketer and academic (d. 1972)
  1883   – Julius Seljamaa, Estonian journalist and politician, Minister of Foreign Affairs of Estonia (d. 1936)
1885 – Dimitrios Levidis, Greek-French soldier, composer, and educator (d. 1951)
1886 – Margaret Ayer Barnes, American author and playwright (d. 1967)
1888 – Dennis Chávez, American journalist and politician (d. 1962)
1889 – Adrian Boult, English conductor (d. 1983)
1892 – Richard Neutra, Austrian-American architect, designer of the Los Angeles County Hall of Records (d. 1970)
  1892   – Mary Pickford, Canadian-American actress, producer, screenwriter and co-founder of United Artists (d. 1979)
1896 – Yip Harburg, American composer (d. 1981)
1900 – Marie Byles, Australian solicitor (d. 1979)

1901–present
1902 – Andrew Irvine, English mountaineer and explorer (d. 1924)
  1902   – Maria Maksakova Sr., Russian soprano (d. 1974)
1904 – John Hicks, English economist and academic, Nobel Prize laureate (d. 1989)
  1904   – Hirsch Jacobs, American horse trainer (d. 1970)
1905 – Joachim Büchner, German sprinter and graphic designer (d. 1978)
  1905   – Helen Joseph, English-South African activist (d. 1992)
  1905   – Erwin Keller, German field hockey player (d. 1971)
1906 – Raoul Jobin, Canadian tenor and educator (d. 1974)
1908 – Hugo Fregonese, Argentinian director and screenwriter (d. 1987)
1909 – John Fante, American author and screenwriter (d. 1983)
1910 – George Musso, American football player and police officer (d. 2000)
1911 – Melvin Calvin, American chemist and academic, Nobel Prize laureate (d. 1997)
  1911   – Emil Cioran, Romanian-French philosopher and academic (d. 1995)
1912 – Alois Brunner, Austrian-German SS officer (d. 2001 or 2010)
  1912   – Sonja Henie, Norwegian-American figure skater and actress (d. 1969)
1914 – María Félix, Yaqui/Basque-Mexican actress (d. 2002)
1915 – Ivan Supek, Croatian physicist, philosopher and writer (d. 2007)
1917 – Winifred Asprey, American mathematician and computer scientist (d. 2007)
  1917   – Lloyd Bott, Australian public servant (d. 2004)
  1917   – Hubertus Ernst, Dutch bishop (d. 2017)
  1917   – Grigori Kuzmin, Russian-Estonian astronomer (d. 1988)
1918 – Betty Ford, American wife of Gerald Ford, 40th First Lady of the United States (d. 2011)
  1918   – Glendon Swarthout, American author and academic (d. 1992)
1919 – Ian Smith, Zimbabwean lieutenant and politician, 1st Prime Minister of Rhodesia (d. 2007)
1921 – Franco Corelli, Italian tenor and actor (d. 2003)
1920 – Carmen McRae, American singer-songwriter, pianist, and actress (d. 1994)
  1921   – Jan Novák, Czech composer (d. 1984)
  1921   – Herman van Raalte, Dutch footballer (d. 2013)
1923 – George Fisher, American cartoonist (d. 2003)
  1923   – Edward Mulhare, Irish-American actor (d. 1997)
1924 – Frédéric Back, German-Canadian animator, director, and screenwriter (d. 2013)
  1924   – Anthony Farrar-Hockley, English general and historian (d. 2006)
  1924   – Kumar Gandharva, Hindustani classical singer (d. 1992)
  1924   – Sara Northrup Hollister, American occultist (d. 1997)
1926 – Henry N. Cobb, American architect and academic, co-founded Pei Cobb Freed & Partners (d. 2020)
  1926   – Shecky Greene, American comedian
  1926   – Jürgen Moltmann, German theologian and academic
1927 – Tilly Armstrong, English author (d. 2010)
  1927   – Ollie Mitchell, American trumpet player and bandleader (d. 2013)
1928 – Fred Ebb, American lyricist (d. 2004)
1929 – Jacques Brel, Belgian singer-songwriter and actor (d. 1978)
  1929   – Renzo De Felice, Italian historian and author (d. 1996)
1930 – Carlos Hugo, Duke of Parma (d. 2010)
1931 – John Gavin, American actor and diplomat, United States Ambassador to Mexico (d. 2018)
1932 – Iskandar of Johor (d. 2010)
  1933   – James Lockhart, American scholar of colonial Latin America, especially Nahua peoples (d. 2014)
1934 – Kisho Kurokawa, Japanese architect, designed the Nakagin Capsule Tower and Singapore Flyer (d. 2007)
1935 – Oscar Zeta Acosta, American lawyer and politician (d. 1974)
  1935   – Albert Bustamante, American soldier, educator, and politician
1937 – Tony Barton, English footballer and manager (d. 1993)
  1937   – Seymour Hersh, American journalist and author
  1937   – Momo Kapor, Serbian author and painter (d. 2010)
1938 – Kofi Annan, Ghanaian economist and diplomat, 7th Secretary-General of the United Nations (d. 2018)
  1938   – John Hamm, Canadian physician and politician, 25th Premier of Nova Scotia
  1938   – Mary W. Gray, American mathematician, statistician, and lawyer
1939 – Manolis Angelopoulos, Greek singer, composer and songwriter (d. 1989)
  1939   – John Arbuthnott, Scottish microbiologist and academic
  1939   – Trina Schart Hyman, American author and illustrator (d. 2004)
1940 – John Havlicek, American basketball player (d. 2019)
1941 – Vivienne Westwood, English fashion designer (d. 2022) 
1942 – Tony Banks, Baron Stratford, Northern Irish politician, Minister for Sport and the Olympics (d. 2006)
  1942   – Roger Chapman, English singer-songwriter and guitarist 
  1942   – Douglas Trumbull, American director, producer, and special effects artist (d. 2022)
1943 – Michael Bennett, American dancer, choreographer, and director (d. 1987)
  1943   – Miller Farr, American football player
  1943   – James Herbert, English author and illustrator (d. 2013)
  1943   – Chris Orr, English painter and illustrator
1944 – Hywel Bennett, Welsh actor (d. 2017)
  1944   – Odd Nerdrum, Swedish-Norwegian painter and illustrator
1945 – Derrick Walker, Scottish businessman
  1945   – Jang Yong, South Korean actor
1946 – Catfish Hunter, American baseball player (d. 1999)
  1946   – Tim Thomerson, American actor and producer
1947 – Tom DeLay, American lawyer and politician
  1947   – Steve Howe, English guitarist, songwriter, and producer 
  1947   – Robert Kiyosaki, American businessman, co-founded Cashflow Technologies
  1947   – Pascal Lamy, French businessman and politician, European Commissioner for Trade
  1947   – Larry Norman, American singer-songwriter, and producer (d. 2008)
1948 – Barbara Young, Baroness Young of Old Scone, Scottish academic and politician
1949 – K. C. Kamalasabayson, Sri Lankan lawyer and politician, 39th Attorney General of Sri Lanka (d. 2007)
  1949   – John Madden, English director and producer
  1949   – Brenda Russell, African-American-Canadian singer-songwriter and keyboard player
  1949   – John Scott, English sociologist and academic
1950 – Grzegorz Lato, Polish footballer and coach
1951 – Gerd Andres, German politician
  1951   – Geir Haarde, Icelandic economist, journalist, and politician, 23rd Prime Minister of Iceland
  1951   – Mel Schacher, American bass player 
  1951   – Joan Sebastian, Mexican singer-songwriter and actor (d. 2015)
  1951   – Phil Schaap, American jazz disc jockey and historian (d. 2021)
1952 – Ahmet Piriştina, Turkish politician (d. 2004)
1954 – Gary Carter, American baseball player and coach (d. 2012)
  1954   – Princess Lalla Amina of Morocco (d. 2012)
  1954   – G.V. Loganathan, Indian-American engineer and academic (d. 2007)
1955 – Gerrie Coetzee, South African boxer
  1955   – Ron Johnson, American businessman and politician
  1955   – Barbara Kingsolver, American novelist, essayist and poet
  1955   – David Wu, Taiwanese-American lawyer and politician
1956 – Michael Benton, Scottish-English paleontologist and academic
  1956   – Christine Boisson, French actress
  1956   – Roman Dragoun, Czech singer-songwriter and keyboard player 
1958 – Detlef Bruckhoff, German footballer
  1958   – Tom Petranoff, American javelin thrower and coach
1959 – Alain Bondue, French cyclist
1960 – John Schneider, American actor and country singer
1961 – Richard Hatch, American reality contestant
  1961   – Brian McDermott, English footballer and manager
1962 – Paddy Lowe, English engineer
  1962   – Izzy Stradlin, American guitarist and songwriter 
1963 – Tine Asmundsen, Norwegian bassist
  1963   – Julian Lennon, English singer-songwriter
  1963   – Terry Porter, American basketball player and coach
  1963   – Donita Sparks, American singer-songwriter and guitarist 
  1963   – Alec Stewart, English cricketer
  1963   – Seth Tobias, American businessman (d. 2007)
1964 – Biz Markie, American rapper, producer, and actor (d. 2021)
  1964   – John McGinlay, Scottish footballer and manager
1965 – Steven Blaney, Canadian businessman and politician, 5th Canadian Minister of Public Safety
  1965   – Michael Jones, New Zealand rugby player and coach
1966 – Iveta Bartošová, Czech singer and actress (d. 2014)
  1966   – Mark Blundell, English race car driver
  1966   – Andy Currier, English rugby league player
  1966   – Charlotte Dawson, New Zealand-Australian television host (d. 2014)
  1966   – Dalton Grant, English high jumper
  1966   – Mazinho, Brazilian footballer, coach, and manager
  1966   – Harri Rovanperä, Finnish race car driver
  1966   – Evripidis Stylianidis, Greek lawyer and politician, Greek Minister for the Interior
  1966   – Robin Wright, American actress, director, producer
1967 – Kenny Benjamin, Antiguan cricketer
1968 – Patricia Arquette, American actress and director
  1968   – Patricia Girard, French runner and hurdler
  1968   – Tracy Grammer, American singer-songwriter and guitarist 
1971 – Darren Jessee, American singer-songwriter and drummer 
1972 – Paul Gray, American bass player and songwriter (d. 2010)
  1972   – Sergei Magnitsky, Russian lawyer and accountant (d. 2009)
1973 – Khaled Badra, Tunisian footballer
  1973   – Emma Caulfield, American actress 
1974 – Toutai Kefu, Tongan-Australian rugby player
  1974   – Nnedi Okorafor, Nigerian-American author and educator
1975 – Anouk, Dutch singer
  1975   – Francesco Flachi, Italian footballer
  1975   – Timo Pérez, Dominican-American baseball player
  1975   – Funda Arar, Turkish singer
1977 – Ana de la Reguera, Mexican actress
  1977   – Mehran Ghassemi, Iranian journalist and author (d. 2008)
  1977   – Mark Spencer, American computer programmer and engineer
1978 – Daigo, Japanese singer-songwriter, actor, and voice actor
  1978   – Bernt Haas, Austrian-Swiss footballer
  1978   – Rachel Roberts, Canadian model and actress
  1978   – Jocelyn Robichaud, Canadian tennis player and coach
  1978   – Evans Rutto, Kenyan runner
1979 – Alexi Laiho, Finnish singer-songwriter and guitarist (d. 2020)
  1979   – Amit Trivedi, Indian singer-songwriter 
1980 – Manuel Ortega, Austrian singer
  1980   – Katee Sackhoff, American actress
  1980   – Mariko Seyama, Japanese announcer, photographer, and model
1981 – Frédérick Bousquet, French swimmer
  1981   – Ofer Shechter, Israeli model, actor, and screenwriter
1982 – Gennady Golovkin, Kazakhstani boxer
  1982   – Brett White, Australian rugby league player
1983 – Tatyana Petrova Arkhipova, Russian runner
1984 – Michelle Donelan, British politician
  1984   – Ezra Koenig, American singer-songwriter and guitarist
  1984   – Pablo Portillo, Mexican singer and actor
  1984   – Taran Noah Smith, American actor
1985 – Patrick Schliwa, German rugby player
  1985   – Yemane Tsegay, Ethiopian runner
1986 – Igor Akinfeev, Russian footballer
  1986   – Félix Hernández, Venezuelan-American baseball player
1987 – Royston Drenthe, Dutch footballer
  1987   – Jeremy Hellickson, American baseball player
  1987   – Elton John, Trinidadian footballer
  1987   – Sam Rapira, New Zealand rugby league player
1988 – Jenni Asserholt, Swedish ice hockey player
1990 – Kim Jong-hyun, South Korean singer (d. 2017) 
1993 – Viktor Arvidsson, Swedish ice hockey player
1994 – Josh Chudleigh, Australian rugby league player
1995 – Cedi Osman, Turkish professional basketball player
1996 – Anna Korakaki, Greek Olympic medalist in shooting 
1997 – Kim Woo-jin, South Korean singer
  1997   – Saygrace, Australian singer and songwriter
  1997   – Arno Verschueren, Belgian professional football player
2002 – Skai Jackson, American actress

Deaths

Pre-1600
 217 – Caracalla, Roman emperor (b. 188)
 622 – Shōtoku, Japanese prince (b. 572)
 632 – Charibert II, Frankish king (b. 607)
 894 – Adalelm, Frankish nobleman
 944 – Wang Yanxi, Chinese emperor 
 956 – Gilbert, Frankish nobleman
 967 – Mu'izz al-Dawla, Buyid emir (b. 915)
1143 – John II Komnenos, Byzantine emperor (b. 1087)
1150 – Gertrude of Babenberg, duchess of Bohemia (b. 1118)
1321 – Thomas of Tolentino, Italian-Franciscan missionary (b. c. 1255)
1338 – Stephen Gravesend, bishop of London 
1364 – John II, French king (b. 1319)
1450 – Sejong the Great, Korean king (b. 1397)
1461 – Georg von Peuerbach, German mathematician and astronomer (b. 1423)
1492 – Lorenzo de' Medici, Italian ruler (b. 1449)
1551 – Oda Nobuhide, Japanese warlord (b. 1510)
1586 – Martin Chemnitz, Lutheran theologian and reformer (b. 1522)

1601–1900
1608 – Magdalen Dacre, English noble (b. 1538)
1612 – Anne Catherine of Brandenburg (b. 1575)
1691 – Carlo Rainaldi, Italian architect, designed the Santa Maria dei Miracoli and Santa Maria in Montesanto (b. 1611)
1697 – Niels Juel, Norwegian-Danish admiral (b. 1629)
1704 – Hiob Ludolf, German orientalist and philologist (b. 1624)
  1704   – Henry Sydney, 1st Earl of Romney, English colonel and politician, Lord Lieutenant of Ireland (b. 1641)
1709 – Wolfgang Dietrich of Castell-Remlingen, German nobleman (b. 1641)
1725 – John Wise, American minister (b. 1652)
1735 – Francis II Rákóczi, Hungarian prince (b. 1676)
1848 – Gaetano Donizetti, Italian composer (b. 1797)
1860 – István Széchenyi, Hungarian statesman and reformer (b.1791) 
1861 – Elisha Otis, American businessman, founded the Otis Elevator Company (b. 1811)
1870 – Charles Auguste de Bériot, Belgian violinist and composer (b. 1802)
1877 – Bernardino António Gomes, Portuguese physician and naturalist (b. 1806)
1894 – Bankim Chandra Chattopadhyay, Indian journalist, author, and poet (b. 1838)

1901–present
1906 – Auguste Deter, German woman, first person diagnosed with Alzheimer's disease (b. 1850)
1919 – Loránd Eötvös, Hungarian physicist, academic, and politician, Hungarian Minister of Education (b. 1848)
1920 – Charles Griffes, American pianist and composer (b. 1884)
1931 – Erik Axel Karlfeldt, Swedish poet Nobel Prize laureate (b. 1864)
1936 – Róbert Bárány, Austrian physician and academic, Nobel Prize laureate (b. 1876)
  1936   – Božena Benešová, Czech poet and novelist (b. 1873)
1941 – Marcel Prévost, French novelist and playwright (b. 1862)
1942 – Kostas Skarvelis, Greek guitarist and composer (b. 1880)
1947 – Olaf Frydenlund, Norwegian target shooter (b. 1862)
1950 – Vaslav Nijinsky, Polish dancer and choreographer (b. 1890)
1959 – Marios Makrionitis, Roman Catholic Archbishop of Athens (b. 1913)
1961 – Joseph Carrodus, Australian public servant (b. 1885)
1962 – Juan Belmonte, Spanish bullfighter (b. 1892)
1965 – Lars Hanson, Swedish actor (b. 1886)
1969 – Zinaida Aksentyeva, Ukrainian astronomer (b. 1900)
1973 – Pablo Picasso, Spanish painter and sculptor (b. 1881)
1974 – James Charles McGuigan, Canadian cardinal (b. 1894)
1979 – Breece D'J Pancake, American short story writer (b. 1952)
1981 – Omar Bradley, American general (b. 1893)
1983 – Isamu Kosugi, Japanese actor and director (b. 1904) 
1984 – Pyotr Kapitsa, Russian physicist and academic, Nobel Prize laureate (b. 1894)
1985 – John Frederick Coots, American pianist and composer (b. 1897)
1990 – Ryan White, American activist, inspired the Ryan White Care Act (b. 1971)
1991 – Per Ohlin, Swedish musician (b. 1969)
1992 – Daniel Bovet, Swiss-Italian pharmacologist and academic, Nobel Prize laureate (b. 1907)
1993 – Marian Anderson, American operatic singer (b. 1897)
1994 – François Rozet, French-Canadian actor (b. 1899)
1996 – Ben Johnson, American actor and stuntman (b. 1918)
  1996   – León Klimovsky, Argentinian-Spanish actor, director, and screenwriter (b. 1906)
  1996   – Mick Young, Australian politician (b. 1936)
1997 – Laura Nyro, American singer-songwriter and pianist (b. 1947)
2000 – František Šťastný, Czech motorcycle racer (b. 1927)
  2000   – Claire Trevor, American actress (b. 1910)
2002 – María Félix, Mexican actress (b. 1914)
  2002   – Harvey Quaytman, American painter (b. 1937)
2004 – Werner Schumacher, German actor (b. 1921)
2005 – Onna White, Canadian choreographer and dancer (b. 1922)
2006 – Gerard Reve, Dutch author and poet (b. 1923)
2007 – Sol LeWitt, American painter and sculptor (b. 1928)
2008 – Kazuo Shiraga, Japanese painter (b. 1924)
2009 – Richard de Mille, American Scientologist, author, investigative journalist, and psychologist (b. 1922)
  2009   – Piotr Morawski, Polish mountaineer (b. 1976)
2010 – Malcolm McLaren, English singer-songwriter (b. 1946)
  2010   – Teddy Scholten, Dutch singer (b. 1926)
2011 – Hedda Sterne, Romanian-American painter and photographer (b. 1910)
2012 – Blair Kiel, American football player and coach (b. 1961)
  2012   – Jack Tramiel, Polish-American businessman, founded Commodore International (b. 1928)
  2012   – Janusz K. Zawodny, Polish-American soldier, historian, and political scientist (b. 1921)
2013 – Mikhail Beketov, Russian journalist (b. 1958)
  2013   – Annette Funicello, American actress and singer (b. 1942)
  2013   – Sara Montiel, Spanish-Mexican actress and singer (b. 1928)
  2013   – José Luis Sampedro, Spanish economist and author (b. 1917)
  2013   – Margaret Thatcher, English politician, first female Prime Minister of the United Kingdom (b. 1925)
2014 – Emmanuel III Delly, Iraqi patriarch (b. 1927)
  2014   – Karlheinz Deschner, German author and activist (b. 1924)
  2014   – Ivan Mercep, New Zealand architect, designed the Te Papa Tongarewa Museum (b. 1930)
2015 – Jayakanthan, Indian journalist and author (b. 1934)
  2015   – Rayson Huang, Hong Kong chemist and academic (b. 1920)
  2015   – Sergei Lashchenko, Ukrainian kick-boxer (b. 1987)
  2015   – David Laventhol, American journalist and publisher (b. 1933)
  2015   – Jean-Claude Turcotte, Canadian cardinal (b. 1936)
2019 – Josine Ianco-Starrels, Romanian-born American art curator (b. 1926)
2020 – Rick May, American-Canadian voice actor  (b. 1940)
  2020   – Abdul Momin Imambari, Bangladeshi Islamic scholar (b. 1930)
2022 – Mimi Reinhardt, Austrian Jewish secretary (b. 1915)

Holidays and observances
 Buddha's Birthday, also known as Hana Matsuri, "Flower Festival" (Japan)
 Christian feast day:
 Anne Ayres (Episcopal Church (USA))
 Constantina
 Julie Billiart of Namur
 Perpetuus
 Walter of Pontoise
 William Augustus Muhlenberg (Episcopal Church (USA))
 April 8 (Eastern Orthodox liturgics)
 Earliest day on which Fast and Prayer Day can fall, while April 14 is the latest; celebrated on the second Friday in April (Liberia)
 International Romani Day

References

External links

 BBC: On This Day
 
 Historical Events on April 8

Days of the year
April